This list of Ribes species shows many of the approximately 200 accepted species in the plant genus Ribes, the single genus in the Saxifragales family Grossulariaceae. Traditionally, these have been divided into a number of subgenera, such as subgenus Ribes (currants) and subgenus Grossularia (gooseberries).

Subgenus Ribes L.

Section Berisia Spach
This section comprises Alpine currants, dioecious species distributed through Eurasia

Section Calobotrya (Spach) Jancz.
This section comprises North American species commonly known as ornamental currants

Section Coreosma (Spach) Jancz.
This section comprises Eurasian and American black currants

Section Symphocalyx Berland.

Section Grossularioides ( Jancz.) Rehd.
This section comprises spiny or Gooseberry-stemmed currants from North America

Section Heritiera Jancz.

Section Parilla Jancz.

Section Ribes L.

Subgenus Grossularia (Mill.) Pers.

Section Grossularia(Mill.) Nutt.

Subgenus Hesperia A.Berger

Subgenus Lobbia A. Berger

Section Robsonia Berland.

Hybrids

 Ribes achurjani 
 Ribes hartwegianum 
 Ribes melananthum 
 Ribes van-fleetianum

References 

 
Ribes